Michael Farries Ashby  (born 20 November 1935) is a British metallurgical engineer. He served as Royal Society Research Professor, and a Principal Investigator (PI) at the Engineering Design Centre at the University of Cambridge. He is known for his contributions in Materials Science in the field of material selection.

In 1990, Ashby was elected as a member into the National Academy of Engineering for outstanding contributions to the understanding of mechanical behavior of materials and for development of formats useful for design.

Education
Ashby is the son of the leading botanist and educator Lord Ashby. He was educated at Campbell College in Belfast and the University of Cambridge where he studied the Natural Sciences Tripos as a student of Queens' College, Cambridge. He received his Bachelor of Arts degree in Metallurgy in 1957 (First Class Honours); his Master of Arts degree in 1959 and his PhD in 1961.

Career and research
By conducting numerous studies on the active deformation mechanisms under different temperature conditions, M.F. Ashby developed a graphical approach for determining these mechanisms. He generalizes this approach to the broader field of material selection by developing the software CMS(Cambridge Materials Selector)in collaboration with David Cebon, with whom he co-founded Granta Design Limited. He also collaborated extensively with Yves Bréchet (CNRS Silver Medal). He continued to work on the software to improve its pedagogical value across Materials Education ( CES EduPack – used at more than 1000 universities worldwide and value to industry (CES Selector). This software is currently available from the company Granta Design, of which he is the chairman.

Ashby has revolutionized the approach to the selection of materials to take into account four aspects: feature, material, geometry, and processes; moreover, he worked with the division in classes and subclasses. In doing so he has developed a comprehensive approach that associates to the expected mechanical functions of an object a performance index that has to be optimized. These indices allow to better take into account all the properties required of a material, such as specific stiffness (ratio between the elastic modulus and density) instead of single elastic module. His approach allows one to rationally choose the most suitable materials for each application.

In practice, this approach firstly asks to identify the performance index starting from the expected function and geometry. Then it is possible to select thresholds for certain properties in order to select the most useful materials from those present in a database that has some 80,000 materials. The division into classes allows pre-selecting representative materials and therefore working only with certain classes of materials. Finally, the selected materials are shown in a 2-dimensional chart, called the Ashby diagram, in order to view those with the highest performance index. These diagrams often contain also nanostructured materials and composites.

 Materials Selection for Mechanical Design – standard text used around the world.
 Materials and Design – book – Aesthetic attributes as well as technical attributes of materials, making products delightful as well as functional.
 Materials Processing Science and Design- introductory textbook – trying to motivate engineers to learn about materials by starting with design.

In more recent years he has concentrated on materials and the environment and sustainability, writing award-winning textbooks and pioneering teaching methods to get this complex topic across to engineering students.
He has been honored by the American Society of Engineering Education by having a teaching prize named after him.

Ashby has achieved a innovative work in the areas of materials, design, and sustainability as well as in that of pedagogy. His works on materials are comparable to those of Carrega and Colombié. His former doctoral students include Lorna Gibson.

Publications
Ashby, Michael F. 'Materials and Sustainable Development', Butterworth Heinemann, 2015 
Ashby, Michael F. 'Materials and the Environment: Eco-informed Material Choice', Butterworth Heinemann, 2009. 2nd Edition 2012 
Ashby, Michael F., Shercliff, Hugh and Cebon, David 'Materials: Engineering, Science, Processing, and Design'. Butterworth Heinemann, 2007. 3rd Edition 2013 
Ashby, Mike and Johnson, Kara 'Materials and Design: The Art and Science of Materials Selection in Product Design' Butterworth Heinemann, Oxford, 2002 
Ashby, M.F. 'How to Write a Paper', 7th Edition 2011
Ashby, M.F. 'Materials Selection and Process in Mechanical Design', Butterworth Heinemann, Oxford, 1999 
Ashby, M.F. and Cebon, D. 'Case studies in Materials Selection', First Edition, Granta Design Ltd, Cambridge, 1996 
Ashby, M.F. and Gibson, L.J. 'Cellular Solids Structure and Properties', Cambridge University Press, Cambridge, 1997 
Asbhy, M.F. and Jones, D.R.H. 'Engineering Materials 1, Second Edition', Butterworth Heineman, Oxford, 1996 
Ashby, M.F. and Jones, D.R.H. 'Engineering Materials 2, Second Edition', Butterworth Heineman, Oxford, 1998 
Ashby, M.F. and Waterman, N.A. 'The Chapman and Hall Material Selector', Chapman and Hall, London, Volumes 1-3, 1996
Ashby, M.F. and Frost H.J. 'Deformation-mechanism maps: the plasticity and creep of metals and ceramics', Pergamon, 1982 
Michael F. Ashby 'Materials Selection in Mechanical Design Pergamon Press 1992 (2nd edition 1999 3rd edition 2005 4th edition 2010)

Honours and awards
Ashby's awards and honours include:
 elected a Fellow of the Royal Society (FRS) in 1979
received the A. A. Griffith Medal and Prize in 1981
 elected a member of the National Academy of Engineering in 1990
 awarded the European Materials Medal of the Federation of European Materials Societies (FEMS) in 1993
elected a Fellow of the Royal Academy of Engineering (FREng) in 1993
 appointed CBE in the 1997 Birthday Honours
 nominated a Foreign Honorary Member of the American Academy of Arts and Sciences in 1993
 awarded the Eringen Medal in 1999

References

1935 births
Living people
Commanders of the Order of the British Empire
Fellows of the Royal Society
Fellows of Clare Hall, Cambridge
Alumni of Queens' College, Cambridge
People educated at Campbell College
Engineers from Belfast
British materials scientists
Fellows of the American Academy of Arts and Sciences
Place of birth missing (living people)
British metallurgists
Sons of life peers
Professors of engineering (Cambridge)